Lee Potter (born 4 January 1972), known by his stage name Cut La Roc, is a British electronic musician, considered as a pioneer of big beat, a genre fusing elements of hip hop, house and rock.

Biography 
Potter grew up in Brighton, England, and was signed to the British record label, Rocstar Recordings.

He started creating and producing music when acid house came on at the end of the eighties. In an interview he described the cause of his "infection" for electronic music and DJing: "I'd never really liked house music up until then, but this was kind of different, because it had the hip-hop element through the breakbeats, it made total sense to me".

In 1998, he released "Post Punk Progression" which NME lauded as "what the Beatles would have sounded like if they'd invented jungle".

In 1999, Cut La Roc produced and released a mix album for the Ministry of Sound's FSUK imprint and performed and produced with 9 decks. He spent three years consistently DJing in Australia, the United States, Europe and Asia.

His DJ sets feature old school hip hop and G-funk to modern hip hop and trap. In 1995, Cut La Roc appeared on BBC One's Top of the Pops as the late electronic musician Wildchild on the original version of "Renegade Master", before Fatboy Slim remixed and revived the song in 1998. In 2001, he produced along with Snow Patrol's Gary Lightbody, the songs "Fallen" and "Mishka". As well as Lightbody co-producing both of the songs, he also provided the vocals. Cut La Roc held a four-year residency at the 'Big Beat Boutique' and performed alongside fellow big beat musicians Fatboy Slim and Armand Van Helden.

References

External links
Cut La Roc on Myspace
Cut La Roc's Label Rocstar Recording
Cut La Roc's profile on Resident Advisor

1972 births
Living people
English songwriters
Club DJs
English DJs
Big beat musicians
Remixers
English record producers
English house musicians
Musicians from Brighton and Hove
Electronic dance music DJs
21st-century English singers
21st-century British male singers
British male songwriters